Schlage is a surname. Notable people with the surname include:

 Walter Schlage, German-born American engineer and inventor
 Willi Schlage (1888–1940), German chess master